The 1877 Melbourne Cup was a two-mile handicap horse race which took place on Tuesday, 6 November 1877.

This year was the seventeenth running of the Melbourne Cup. Although slippery and muddy, the race time was a new record.

This is the list of placegetters for the 1877 Melbourne Cup.

See also

 Melbourne Cup
 List of Melbourne Cup winners
 Victoria Racing Club

References

External links
1877 Melbourne Cup footyjumpers.com

1877
Melbourne Cup
Melbourne Cup
19th century in Melbourne
1870s in Melbourne